Rhodesia was one of the participants at the inaugural Paralympic Games in 1960 in Rome, where one of its two representatives was Margaret Harriman, in swimming and archery. The country took part in every edition of the Summer Paralympics until 1972. Although Rhodesia was barred from all Olympics from 1968 until its disestablishment in 1979 after its 1965 Unilateral Declaration of Independence from the United Kingdom, it was allowed to participate in the 1968 Tel Aviv and 1972 Heidelberg games because politicians, both from Britain and the host nations of the games, were unwilling to sanction athletes with disabilities. However, the Canadian government refused to grant visas for the Rhodesian Paralympic team to attend the 
1976 Toronto Paralympics.

Rhodesia ceased to exist before the 1980 Summer Paralympics, in which its successor state, Zimbabwe, competed.

List of medalists 
Over their four appearances, Rhodesians won a total of 21 gold medals, 18 silver and 15 bronze.

Andrew James Scott went on to compete for Zimbabwe, winning a number of silver and bronze medals in 1980.

See also
 Zimbabwe at the Paralympics
 Rhodesia at the Olympics

References